The settee sail was a lateen sail with the front corner cut off, giving it a quadrilateral shape. It can be traced back to Greco-Roman navigation in the Mediterranean in late antiquity; the oldest evidence is from a late-5th-century AD ship mosaic at Kelenderis, Cilicia. It lasted well into the 20th century as a common sail on Arab dhows. The settee sail requires a shorter yard than does the lateen, and both settee and lateen have shorter masts than square-rigged sails.

Settees (or saëtia) then were a sharp-prowed, single-decked merchant sailing vessel found in the Mediterranean (more in the Levant than in the Western Mediterranean), in the 18th and 19th centuries. The Spaniards also used them in the New World.

Settees had two lateen-rigged masts, like xebecs or galleys, but carrying settee sails. They sailed well to windward and could sail downwind. Some polaccas carried a settee sail, giving rise to the polacca-settee (or polacre-settee).

Between the 1880s and the 1960s, Gozo boats had a settee rig.

See also 
Lateen (a triangular sail)
Tanja sail
Crab claw sail

References

Sources 

Sailing rigs and rigging
Ship types